Parrish Baker (born 1968) is a Kansas City comics artist and cartoonist, best known for Sparrow's Fall, a series of minicomics begun in 1996. He began drawing comics in 1995. His first comic, Calyx, was a science fiction comic based on earlier, unpublished science fiction novels and short stories.

Sparrow's Fall follows the adventures of Christopher Sparrow and several other characters, mostly animals, including Mr. Nips, the possum, Chirp, the otter, and Mortimer Easter, the cat. They live at the nexus of an alternate universe, which joins ours in Kansas City. (The precise umbilical is the KCPT tower; the two worlds are most similar at this point, and with increasing distance from it, they resemble each other less and less.) They belong wholly to this world, and he belongs to ours, but somehow penetrates theirs, through madness or some other reason. One feature of the alternate world is that little time ever passes, and it is always a year that seems like 1996 to Christopher; apparently time cycles here.

While not an accomplished artist, Baker has been a prolific one, who however is mostly known only in Kansas City. His work has appeared in only one nationally known anthology, the 2003 Small Press Expo Anthology, and two local Kansas City comics anthologies. He has been published in the Kansas City Star, Fire & Knives, and KC Magazine. His work regularly appears as a full page in the Back~Pages, a Kansas City midtown monthly neighborhood publication.

His art is frequently somewhat muddy and confused. Sometimes called amateurish, it is densely drawn and washed, often with a large amount of text in a somewhat crabbed handwriting. A signature technique is that he often leaves pencilled underdrawing in place under the inks, to support them and indicate motion of the character or object. This technique is oparticularly criticized, and will likely prevent him from reaching a mass audience.

The content is sometimes misleadingly banal, with Seinfeld-esque plots that begin and end nowhere. However, the stories often hold a deeper meaning, critical of society, commonly held beliefs, politics, and even of the artist himself. Occasionally Baker erupts into political diatribes, but this is generally rare: he will usually avoid strong outward positions. This is not true, however, of his recent criticisms of society at large as the Great Panopticon, a seemingly menacing, all-seeing, all-consuming enemy that Baker strongly resents.

In light of his distrust of the rapidly expanding (and possibly soon to rapidly disintegrate) modern world, he is somewhat of a comics loner, he prefers self-publishing and distribution, and prefers not to charge money for his work wherever possible. His comics can be found primarily at Muddy's Coffee Shop, the Broadway Cafe, and YJ's Snack Shop, all of Kansas City. He is a member of the Broadway Group, whose other members include Daniel Spottswood, Scot Stolfus, Stephen Bushman, Michael Buckley, and Daniel Jacobson.

A proponent of minicomics, Baker believes strongly in the credo of self-publishing. Suspicious of the modern age and state/corporate control of media, he largely rejects attempts to become printed by established publishers, and instead propagates his work by his own hand, and encourages others to do the same.

Sparrow's Fall has been released in several collections, including, most recently, Truespoon, #1, Truespoon #2, and Truespoon #3.

External links
 https://web.archive.org/web/20060704184926/http://parrishbaker.com/
 the Broadway Group, an informal Kansas City comics artists' group
 Indiespinnerrack podcast review of his work about 29 minutes into the interview

1968 births
American cartoonists
American comics artists
Living people
Artists from Kansas City, Missouri